Mount St. Mary's Hospital and Health Center is a Catholic hospital in Lewiston, New York, just north of Niagara Falls, New York, where approximately 60% of the hospital's patients reside.

History
A part of the Niagara Community for more than a century, Mount St. Mary's Hospital and Health Center began as the "Little House on the Corner" in Niagara Falls in 1907.

Founded by the Sisters of St. Francis of Williamsville, at the request of the Bishop of Buffalo, the hospital provided services to all, especially the poor. In 1965, a new hospital was opened on a 30-acre campus in Lewiston.

Mount St. Mary's Hospital joined Catholic Health on July 1, 2015.

Services
Mount St. Mary's includes:
 175-bed licensed acute care facility
 Full service 24/7 EmStar Emergency Department
 Clearview inpatient chemical dependency unit
 250-bed skilled care and rehabilitation center, Our Lady of Peace Nursing Care Residence
 Center for Women OB/GYN Maternity unit
 Primary care clinic located in the inner city of the City of Niagara Falls
 Primary care clinic located on the hospital's Lewiston campus
 Child care center
 Charitable foundation

Staff includes nearly 200 physicians, more than 300 RNs and LPNs, and allied health professionals and numerous employees in supporting roles. In all, Mount St. Mary's Hospital and Health Center employs more than 1,200 people and has about 250 volunteers.  Mount St. Mary's is a New York State Department of Health Designated Stroke Center and a certified Chest Pain Center.  It is also the only hospital in the Niagara area accredited by The Joint Commission.

References 

Hospitals in New York (state)
Catholic hospitals in North America
Hospitals established in 1907
Catholic health care